West Cornwall Hospital is a hospital located in  Penzance, Cornwall, England. It is managed by the Royal Cornwall Hospitals NHS Trust.

History
The hospital has its origins in the Penzance Dispensary established in 1809. This became the West Cornwall Dispensary and Infirmary in 1873 and the West Cornwall Hospital in 1928. It joined the National Health Service in 1948. A new CT scanner and new X-ray equipment were installed at the hospital in spring 2018.

Services
The hospital has a 24-hour urgent care centre, two medical wards and a day case surgery.

See also
Healthcare in Cornwall
List of hospitals in England

References

External links 
 
 Inspection reports from the Care Quality Commission

Hospitals in Cornwall
NHS hospitals in England